The 2007 Tour de France the 94th running of the race, took place from 7 to 29 July. The Tour began with a prologue in London, and ended with the traditional finish in Paris. Along the way, the route also passed through Belgium and Spain. It was won by Spanish rider Alberto Contador.

The Tour was marked by doping controversies, with three riders and two teams withdrawn during the race following positive doping tests, including pre-race favourite Alexander Vinokourov and his Astana team. Following Stage 16, the leader of the general classification, Michael Rasmussen, was removed from the Tour by his Rabobank team, who accused him of lying about the reasons for missing several drug tests earlier in the year.

The points classification, indicated by the green jersey, was won for the first time by Tom Boonen, who had failed to complete the previous two Tours after leading the points classification at times during each. The mountains classification, indicated by the polkadot jersey, was won by Mauricio Soler in his first Tour appearance.

The general classification, indicated by the yellow jersey, was closely contested until the final time trial on stage 19. The top three riders, Alberto Contador in the yellow jersey as the leader, Cadel Evans in second, and Levi Leipheimer in third, were separated by only 2:49, with both Evans and Leipheimer recognized as far superior time trialists to Contador. In the end, each rider held his place after the final time trial, but with considerably slimmer margins, as the Tour ended with the smallest-ever spread of only 31 seconds among the top three riders. Alberto Contador also won the young rider classification, indicated by the white jersey, as the best young (under age 25) rider.

Teams

A total of 21 teams were invited to the 2007 Tour de France. Each team sent a total of nine riders to participate in the Tour, which brought the starting total of the peloton to 189 riders. The presentation of the teams – where each team's roster are introduced in front of the media and local dignitaries – took place at Trafalgar Square in London, the day before the opening prologue held in the city.

The teams entering the race were:

UCI ProTour teams

Invited teams

Pre-race favourites
After the retirement of seven-time winner Lance Armstrong and with Ivan Basso and Floyd Landis not entering the Tour, the bookmakers' favourite to win the 2007 Tour de France was Alexander Vinokourov, who was unable to start in 2006 due to lack of team members, but did win the 2006 Vuelta a España. The main challengers were expected to be the 2006 Tour de France second-place finisher Andreas Klöden; and Alejandro Valverde, who dropped out of the 2006 Tour de France after a crash, but came second to Vinokourov in the 2006 Vuelta a España.

Route and stages

The organisers of the Tour and London mayor Ken Livingstone announced on 24 January 2006 that the start of the Tour would take place in London. Livingstone noted the two stages would commemorate the victims of the 7 July 2005 London bombings, saying "Having the Grand Départ on the seventh of July will broadcast to the world that terrorism does not shake our city."

The routes for the Prologue in London and the first full stage through Kent, finishing in Canterbury, were announced on 9 February 2006 at the Queen Elizabeth II Conference Centre. This was the first time the Grand Départ was in the United Kingdom and the third time the Tour visited the United Kingdom, including Plymouth in 1974 and two stages in Kent, Sussex and Hampshire in 1994.

Tour director Christian Prudhomme unveiled the 2007 route in Paris on 26 October 2006. In total, the route covered .

Race overview

Doping cases

The first scandal arrived when it was made public on 18 July that rider Patrik Sinkewitz from the  had tested positive one month before the Tour started. Sinkewitz had already withdrawn from the race having incurred an injury during the 8th stage. The scandal was big enough to prompt German TV broadcasters ZDF and ARD to drop their coverage.

The Tour was dealt a major blow when the first-place  team withdrew from the race on 24 July 2007, after team member and pre-race favourite Alexander Vinokourov from Kazakhstan tested positive for an illegal blood transfusion. Vinokourov's teammates Andreas Klöden and Andrey Kashechkin were in 5th and 7th place respectively at the time.

At the start of the 16th stage on 25 July, some teams made a protest against the laxness of the official attitude to doping in the race. After the stage, race officials announced that  team member Cristian Moreni of Italy had tested positive for elevated levels of testosterone, and the Cofidis team withdrew from the race.

Spanish cyclist Iban Mayo tested positive for EPO on the second rest day of the Tour, on 24 July.

French prosecutors wanted to start a legal case against Vinokourov, Mayo and Moreni, and requested the UCI to hand over the doping samples. The UCI refused to give them, and in May 2011 the investigation was stopped.

Other incidents
German cyclist Marcus Burghardt collided with a Labrador Retriever during Stage 9. The bike struck the dog on its backside, which buckled the front wheel and threw Burghardt over the handlebars onto the road.

A second incident involving a dog occurred on Stage 18. Sandy Casar and Frederik Willems were in a four-man break when Casar collided with a dog running across the road, causing both him and Willems to fall. Casar was able to rejoin the break with the help of Axel Merckx despite receiving road rash on his right buttock, while Willems returned to the peloton. Casar went on to win the stage.

After Stage 16, overall leader Michael Rasmussen was fired by his team, for violating team rules after he told the team that he was in Mexico with his wife in June, then being sighted training in Italy by Italian journalist Davide Cassani. Rasmussen disputed this claim, maintaining that he was in Mexico. Thus, at the start of stage 17 there was no holder of the yellow jersey. Afterward the lead and the jersey were transferred to 's Alberto Contador. Rasmussen later in 2013 confessed to doping from 1998 to 2010, including at the 2007 Tour de France.

Classification leadership and minor prizes

There were four main classifications contested in the 2007 Tour de France, with the most important being the general classification. The general classification was calculated by adding each cyclist's finishing times on each stage. The cyclist with the least accumulated time was the race leader, identified by the yellow jersey; the winner of this classification was considered the winner of the Tour. There were no time bonuses given at the end of stages for this edition of the Tour.

Additionally, there was a points classification, which awards a green jersey. In the points classification, cyclists get points for finishing among the best in a stage finish, or in intermediate sprints. The cyclist with the most points led the classification, and is identified with a green jersey.

There was also a mountains classification. The organization categorised some climbs as either hors catégorie, first, second, third, or fourth-category; points for this classification were won by the first cyclists that reach the top of these climbs, with more points available for the higher-categorised climbs. The cyclist with the most points led the classification, and wore a white jersey with red polka dots.

The fourth individual classification was the young rider classification, marked by the white jersey. This classification was calculated the same way as the general classification, but the classification was restricted to riders who were born on or after 1 January 1987.

For the team classification, the times of the best three cyclists per team on each stage were added; the leading team is the team with the lowest total time. The riders in the team that lead this classification were identified with yellow numbers.

The super-combativity award was given to Amets Txurruka. The Souvenir Henri Desgrange given in honour of Tour founder Henri Desgrange to the first rider to pass the summit of the Col du Galibier on stage 9. This prize was won by Mauricio Soler.

 In stage 1, Andreas Klöden, who was second in the points classification, wore the green jersey, because Fabian Cancellara (in first place) wore the yellow jersey as leader of the general classification during that stage.
 In stage 8, Mauricio Soler, who was second in the young riders classification, wore the white jersey, because Linus Gerdemann (in first place) wore the yellow jersey as leader of the general classification during that stage.
 In stage 9, Sylvain Chavanel, who was second in the king of the mountains classification, wore the polka-dot jersey, because Michael Rasmussen (in first place) wore the yellow jersey as leader of the general classification during that stage.
 In stages 10, 11, 12, 13, 14, 15, and 16, Mauricio Soler, who was second in the king of the mountains classification, wore the polka-dot jersey, because Michael Rasmussen (in first place) wore the yellow jersey as leader of the general classification during that stage.
 Shortly after Michael Rasmussen won stage 16, his  team removed him from the Tour for violation of team rules; therefore in stage 17, no one wore the yellow jersey.
 In stage 18, 19, and 20, Amets Txurruka, who was third in the young riders classification, wore the white jersey, because Alberto Contador (in first place) wore the yellow jersey as leader of the general classification during that stage and Mauricio Soler (in second place) wore the polka-dot jersey for leading the king of the mountains classification.

Final standings

General classification

Points classification

Mountains classification

Young rider classification

Team classification

UCI ProTour rankings
Riders in the UCI ProTour (therefore not members of the wildcard entries  or ) are awarded UCI ProTour points for their performance in the Tour de France. The winner of a stage receives 10 points, second receives 5 points and third 3 points. UCI ProTour points are also awarded for high places in the final classification, with 100 points for the overall winner.

See also
 List of doping cases in cycling

Notes

References

Bibliography

Further reading

External links

 
 2007 Tour de France at Cyclingnews.com

 
Tour de France
Tour de France by year
Tour de France
Tour de France
Tour de France
Tour de France